The name Farrar-Hockley may refer to:

Sir Anthony Farrar-Hockley (1924–2006), British full general and military historian
Dair Farrar-Hockley (b. 1946), British major-general and son of Anthony Farrar-Hockley

See also
Farrar (surname)
Hockley (disambiguation)